Baltazar Maria de Morais Júnior (born 27 July 1959), known simply as Baltazar, is a Brazilian retired footballer who played as a striker.

During an 18-year professional career he played, other than in his country, in Spain, Portugal, France and Japan, winning several individual scoring honours. He appeared with the Brazil national team that won the 1989 Copa América.

Club career
Born in Goiânia, Goiás, Baltazar started playing with hometown club Atlético Goianiense. He signed for Grêmio in 1979, going on to score in double digits during his entire four-season spell a recording a best of 14 in 1980 while being an instrumental attacking unit in the team's back-to-back Gauchão conquests; in the 1981's Série A final against São Paulo, after missing a penalty kick in the first leg (2–1 home win), he scored the only goal in the second match for a first-ever national championship conquest.

In the following four years, Baltazar played for Palmeiras (two spells), Flamengo and Botafogo, netting 13 times for the second side in another Brazilian championship conquest. He had his first abroad experience aged 26, being relegated from the Spanish La Liga with RC Celta de Vigo.

In 1986–87, Baltazar propelled the Galicians back into the top level by scoring a career-best 34 goals, also a best-ever in the second division. In a game in December, he accidentally collided with CD Málaga goalkeeper José Antonio Gallardo who died days later from a cerebral haemorrhage; he mourned the death which some had blamed him for.

Baltazar only found the net on six occasions in the following season, but the club retained its league status. He subsequently stayed in the country and joined Atlético Madrid, scoring 35 goals in 36 contests in his first season – his second Pichichi in three years – and adding 18 in the following; however, after the emergence of younger Manolo, the 31-year-old was deemed surplus to requirements by manager Tomislav Ivić and, in November 1990, signed for FC Porto in Portugal, being used almost exclusively as a substitute during his only season.

Until his retirement at the age of 37 in 1996, Baltazar played for Stade Rennais (France), Goiás and Kyoto Purple Sanga (Japan).

International career
Baltazar played for Brazil at the 1989 Copa América which was held on home soil, appearing in three group stage matches for the eventual winners (including the 0–0 against Colombia as a starter). However, during nearly one full decade, he only earned a total of six caps and scored two goals.

Post-retirement
Highly religious, Baltazar was nicknamed O Artilheiro de Deus (God's striker). He became a minister after retiring from football, settling in his hometown and fathering two children.

Career statistics

Club

International

Honours

Club
Grêmio
Campeonato Brasileiro Série A: 1981
Campeonato Gaúcho: 1979, 1980

Flamengo
Campeonato Brasileiro Série A: 1983

Porto
Taça de Portugal: 1990–91

Goiás
Campeonato Goiano: 1994

International
Brazil
Copa América: 1989

Individual
Campeonato Goiano: Top Scorer 1978, 1994
Campeonato Gaúcho: Top Scorer 1980, 1981
Campeonato Carioca: Top Scorer 1984
Campeonato Brasileiro Série B: Top Scorer 1994
Pichichi Trophy: 1986–87 (Segunda División), 1988–89

References

External links

1959 births
Living people
Sportspeople from Goiânia
Brazilian footballers
Association football forwards
Campeonato Brasileiro Série A players
Campeonato Brasileiro Série B players
Grêmio Foot-Ball Porto Alegrense players
Sociedade Esportiva Palmeiras players
CR Flamengo footballers
Botafogo de Futebol e Regatas players
Goiás Esporte Clube players
La Liga players
Segunda División players
RC Celta de Vigo players
Atlético Madrid footballers
Primeira Liga players
FC Porto players
Ligue 1 players
Stade Rennais F.C. players
J1 League players
Japan Football League (1992–1998) players
Kyoto Sanga FC players
Brazil under-20 international footballers
Brazil international footballers
1989 Copa América players
Copa América-winning players
Brazilian expatriate footballers
Expatriate footballers in Spain
Expatriate footballers in Portugal
Expatriate footballers in France
Expatriate footballers in Japan
Brazilian expatriate sportspeople in Spain
Brazilian expatriate sportspeople in Japan
Pichichi Trophy winners
Brazilian Christian religious leaders
Brazilian expatriate sportspeople in France
Brazilian expatriate sportspeople in Portugal